Lipps Inc. (a pun on the phrase "lip sync") was an American disco and funk group from Minneapolis, Minnesota. The group is best known for the chart-topping 1980 worldwide hit single "Funkytown", which hit No. 1 in 28 countries and was certified as double platinum in sales.

The group originally consisted of lead vocalist Cynthia Johnson and a changing line-up of session musicians including guitarist David Rivkin, guitarist Tom Riopelle and bassist Terry Grant. Steven Greenberg, the creator of the act, wrote and produced most of the group's music.

History
Lipps Inc. started as a project of Steven Greenberg, at the time a wedding DJ who wanted to try his hand at writing disco songs. He had intended to use the name Lip Sync, but it was already in use by another group, so instead he chose the homophone Lipps, Inc. Greenberg was the sole member of the group until he met Cynthia Johnson while auditioning singers for his song "Rock It". Johnson subsequently joined the project and Lipps Inc. became a duo.

Lipps Inc.'s first release was a 1979 single, "Rock It", on Greenberg's own Flight imprint. The act released its debut album Mouth to Mouth in late 1979.

The second single from this album, "Funkytown", spent four weeks at #1 on both the Billboard Hot 100 and Hot Dance Music/Club Play charts in the United States. The 7" single sold over two million copies within a few months and was awarded a platinum record within the year of its release. It reached #2 in the United Kingdom and was a hit throughout the world.

Lipps Inc.'s later singles failed to match the band's initial success (the only other Hot 100 entry was "Rock It", which peaked at #64). However, more dance hits were released during the 1980s, including "How Long" in 1981 (originally a hit for Ace), which reached #4 on the U.S. dance chart. After the third album Designer Music, Johnson left the band and was replaced by Margie Cox and Melanie Rosales. Lipps Inc. released its final album, 4, in 1983, and disbanded two years later.

Europe
The 'face' of the group in the Netherlands was the British dancer Doris D (Debbie Jenner), who playbacked the song in TopPop with her dancers. Due to the success of this performance, they were also invited to perform as Lipps Inc. in other European countries, including Germany, Jenner and her dancers then had success as Doris D & The Pins in early 1981.

Awards and recognitions
 Three Billboard Music Awards, 1980
 Platinum and Double-Platinum Status with Funkytown
 Inductee into Minnesota Music Hall of Fame

Discography

Studio albums

Compilation albums

Singles

See also
List of artists who reached number one in the United States
List of artists who reached number one on the U.S. dance chart

References

External links
Photo gallery of Lipps, Inc.
 
 

American dance music groups
American funk musical groups
American disco groups
Musical groups from Minnesota
Musical groups established in 1979
Musical groups disestablished in 1985
Casablanca Records artists